Father Alexander Karloutsos is a Protopresbyter in the Greek Orthodox Archdiocese of America. He served in the Diocese for over fifty years, and is the second member of the Greek Orthodox clergy to be awarded the Presidential Medal of Freedom, acknowledging his counsel to several Presidents.

Background and early life 
Karloutsos attended Hellenic College Holy Cross Greek Orthodox School of Theology, graduating in 1966, and receiving his master's degree in 1969. He was ordained as a priest in 1970, working at the Saints Helen and Constantine Greek Orthodox Church in Chicago, shortly before it was converted to a mosque. By 1974 he was in New York, serving as the Director of the Office of Church and Society, starting in 1978. By 1984 Archbishop Iakovos had conferred the title of Presbyter on Father Karloutsos, and a decade later Patriarch Bartholemew elevated him to Protopresbyter of the Ecumenical Patriarchate, "the highest honor a married clergyman can receive in the Orthodox Christian Church", after spending two years serving as Special Assistant to the Patriarch. From 1986 to 1992, and again from 1999 to 2004, Father Karloutsos was the executive director of Leadership 100, an organization that promotes the Orthodox faith and the legacy of Greek culture and history. In 2017 he was awarded the Cross of the Order of the Holy Sepulcher by Patriarch Theophilos III of Jerusalem. Since 2019 Father Karloutsos has been Vicar General of the Archdiocese of America, the first person to hold the title since Archbishop Iakovos.

Personal life 
Father Karloutsos is married the Presbytera Xanthi Karavellas, and the two have three children. His wife is active in the Orthodox Church and community, and serves on the board of the Beau Biden Foundation.

References 

Living people
American clergy

Year of birth missing (living people)
Presidential Medal of Freedom recipients